Arjan Bajwa (born 3 September 1979) is an Indian actor known for his work in Hindi and Telugu films. He is credited as Deepak in Telugu films where he started his career. He made a breakthrough in Bollywood with the critically acclaimed 2007 film Guru after debuting in the 2004 Hindi film Woh Tera Naam Tha. He played the male lead in 2008 film Fashion for which he received the Stardust Award for Breakthrough Performance.

Early life
Bajwa was born on 3 September 1979 in Delhi, India into a Punjabi Jatt Sikh family of the Bajwa clan. His father Swinderjeet Singh Bajwa was a former deputy Mayor of Delhi from the Bharatiya Janata Party (BJP). Bajwa holds a degree in architecture from Delhi and is a black belt in Taekwondo.

Before entering films Bajwa was a successful model having walked the ramp for several big fashion designers. His breakthrough on television started off with several commercials for brands like Lux, Veet, Fiat Palio, Godrej AC etc. These advertisements featured him alongside some of the most prominent actresses of Bollywood such as Aishwariya Rai, Katrina Kaif and Preity Zinta.

Career
He made his Telugu debut with Sampangi (2001) and played the lead in a couple of Telugu films including Premalo Pavani Kalyan (2002). After making his Hindi debut in Woh Tera Naam Tha, Bajwa's breakthrough role came in Bollywood with director Mani Ratnam's critically acclaimed film, Guru, playing the antagonist opposite Abhishek Bachchan and Aishwarya Rai. Subsequently, he played the male lead in Madhur Bhandarkar’s Fashion with Priyanka Chopra. The film won him the Stardust Award for Breakthrough Performance while Fashion won several awards such as Filmfare, IIFA, Star Screen and Stardust Awards along with two National Awards. Bajwa also starred in the Telugu movie King along with Nagarjuna Akkineni and Trisha. He then appeared in another Telugu film Arundhati starring Anushka Shetty and Sonu Sood, which became one of the highest grossing Telugu films at that time.

Bajwa then appeared in Ajay Devgn's action comedy film Son of Sardaar, where he was paired with Sonakshi Sinha. He also acted in the action thriller Crook (2010) with Emraan Hashmi and Bobby Jasoos (2014) with Vidya Balan. He has appeared in the film Rustom starring Akshay Kumar, Ileana D'Cruz and Esha Gupta which was released in August 2016. In 2019, he was seen in Sandeep Vanga's Kabir Singh where he played Shahid Kapoor's brother. He was initially hesitant to play the male lead's older brother, but accepted at the insistence of Vanga, for whom he was the only choice to play the character.

In addition to acting, Bajwa has hosted the Filmfare Awards (South) in the year 2007, the International Film Festival of India Goa closing ceremony in 2010 and 2014 and the Kabaddi World Cup opening ceremony in Jalandher. Bajwa also hosted the PTC Punjabi Film Awards in 2014 and 2016.

Filmography

Television

Discography

 Ghar Aaja Sohneya Remix by Shazia Manzoor (1998) (Cameo Role)

References

External links
 
 
 

1979 births
Living people
Punjabi people
Indian male models
Male actors from Delhi
Indian male film actors
Indian male taekwondo practitioners
Male actors in Telugu cinema
Male actors in Hindi cinema
Male actors in Punjabi cinema
Male actors in Tamil cinema